TheNiche is a Nigerian daily online newspaper established on 20 April 2014, in Ikeja, Lagos State. TheNiche was registered under the Companies and Allied Matters Act of 1990 and is published by Acclaim Communications Limited.

History
TheNiche is an online newspaper publication founded by Nigerian journalists—Managing Director/Editor-in-chief Ikechukwu Amaechi, Eugene Onyeji, Emeka Duru and Kehinde Okeowo. TheNiche commenced publication on 20 April 2014.

In 2018, the organisation set up TheNiche Foundation for Development Journalism in pursuit of these ideals.

The third and fourth editions in 2020 and 2021 did not hold because of the COVID-19 pandemic.

In 2022, the organisation inducted Babatunde Fashola, Kingsley Moghalu, Anya Oko Anya, Christopher Kolade, Remi Sonaiya and Tanko Yakasai into its Hall of Fame, an honour reserved for the individuals who delivered speech on TheNiche Annual Lecture or acted as chairpersons.

TheNiche Annual Lecture
TheNiche holds Annual Lectures every year to talk the country's economy and democracy.

On 8 September 2022, Babatunde Fashola, the Minister of Works and Housing of Nigeria, debated on the 2023 Nigerian elections and the future of Nigeria's democracy at the 2022 edition of TheNiche Annual Lecture.

References

2014 establishments in Nigeria
Daily newspapers published in Nigeria
English-language newspapers published in Africa
Online newspapers published in Nigeria
Publications established in 2014